Chamber music by Johann Sebastian Bach refers to the compositions in the tenth chapter of the Bach-Werke-Verzeichnis (BWV, catalogue of Bach's compositions), or, in the New Bach Edition, the compositions in Series VI. Chamber music is understood as containing:
 Works for solo violin, cello or flute (not including works for solo keyboard instruments or lute which are contained elsewhere in the BWV catalogue and the New Bach Edition);
 Chamber music works for two or more players (where concertos for multiple players, and orchestral suites also fall outside the chamber music designation)

Works for solo violin, cello or flute

Sonatas and partitas for solo violin (BWV 1001–1006)

 BWV 1001 – Sonata No. 1 in G minor
 BWV 1002 – Partita No. 1 in B minor
 BWV 1003 – Sonata No. 2 in A minor
 BWV 1004 – Partita No. 2 in D minor
 BWV 1005 – Sonata No. 3 in C major
 BWV 1006 – Partita No. 3 in E major
 BWV 1006a – Suite in E major for solo lute (transcription of Partita No. 3 for solo violin, BWV 1006)

Suites for solo cello (BWV 1007–1012)

 BWV 1007 – Cello Suite No. 1 in G major
 BWV 1008 – Cello Suite No. 2 in D minor
 BWV 1009 – Cello Suite No. 3 in C major
 BWV 1010 – Cello Suite No. 4 in E-flat major
 BWV 1011 – Cello Suite No. 5 in C minor
 BWV 1012 – Cello Suite No. 6 in D major

Partita for solo flute (BWV 1013)
 BWV 1013 – Partita in A minor for solo flute

Two or more instruments

Six sonatas for violin and harpsichord (BWV 1014–1019)

 BWV 1014 – Sonata in B minor for violin and harpsichord
 BWV 1015 – Sonata in A major for violin and harpsichord
 BWV 1016 – Sonata in E major for violin and harpsichord
 BWV 1017 – Sonata in C minor for violin and harpsichord
 BWV 1018 – Sonata in F minor for violin and harpsichord
 BWV 1018a – Adagio in F minor for violin and harpsichord (early version of movement 3 from BWV 1018)
 BWV 1019 – Sonata in G major for violin and harpsichord
 BWV 1019a – Sonata in G major for violin and harpsichord (earlier version of BWV 1019)

Other works for accompanied violin (BWV 1020–1026)
 BWV 1020 – Sonata in G minor for violin (or flute) and harpsichord (now attributed to Carl Philipp Emanuel Bach – H 542.5)
 BWV 1021 – Sonata in G major for violin and basso continuo
 BWV 1022 – Sonata in F major for violin and harpsichord (doubtful, possibly by C. P. E. Bach)
 BWV 1023 – Sonata in E minor for violin and basso continuo
 BWV 1024 – Sonata in C minor for violin and basso continuo (doubtful)
 BWV 1025 – Suite in A major for violin and harpsichord (after a sonata by Sylvius Leopold Weiss) (doubtful, possibly by C. P. E. Bach)
 BWV 1026 – Fugue in G minor for violin and basso continuo (doubtful)

Sonatas for viola da gamba and harpsichord (BWV 1027–1029)

 BWV 1027 – Sonata No. 1 in G major for viola da gamba and harpsichord (arrangement of BWV 1039)
 BWV 1027a – Trio in G major for organ (arrangement of movement 4 from BWV 1027)
 BWV 1028 – Sonata No. 2 in D major for viola da gamba and harpsichord
 BWV 1029 – Sonata No. 3 in G minor for viola da gamba and harpsichord

Sonatas for accompanied flute (BWV 1030–1035)
 BWV 1030 – Sonata in B minor for flute and harpsichord
 BWV 1030a – Sonata in G minor for harpsichord and unknown instrument (oboe or viola da gamba conjectured) – earlier version of BWV 1030 of which only harpsichord part survives
 BWV 1031 – Sonata in E-flat major for flute and harpsichord (doubtful, possibly by Carl Philipp Emanuel Bach as H 545)
 BWV 1032 – Sonata in A major for flute and harpsichord
 BWV 1033 – Sonata in C major for flute and basso continuo (doubtful, possibly by C. P. E. Bach)
 BWV 1034 – Sonata in E minor for flute and basso continuo
 BWV 1035 – Sonata in E major for flute and basso continuo

Trio sonatas (BWV 1036–1040)
 BWV 1036 – Sonata in D minor for 2 violins and basso continuo (now attributed to Carl Philipp Emanuel Bach)
 BWV 1037 – Sonata in C major for 2 violins and basso continuo (now attributed to Johann Gottlieb Goldberg)
 BWV 1038 – Sonata in G major for flute, violin and basso continuo (doubtful, possibly by C. P. E. Bach)
 BWV 1039 – Sonata in G major for 2 flutes and basso continuo
 BWV 1040 – Canonic sonata in F major for oboe, violin and basso continuo

Chamber music works in the 10th chapter of the Bach-Werke-Verzeichnis (1998)

|- id="Sonatas and partitas for solo violin" style="background: #E3F6CE;"
| data-sort-value="1001.000" | 1001
| data-sort-value="411.002" | 10.
| data-sort-value="1720-07-01" | 1720
| Sonatas and partitas for solo violin No. 1: Sonata No. 1
| G min.
| Vl
| data-sort-value="000.27 1: 003" | 271: 3
| data-sort-value="VI/01: 003" | VI/1: 3rev 3: 3
| → BWV 1000, 539/2
| 
|- style="background: #E3F6CE;"
| data-sort-value="1002.000" | 1002
| data-sort-value="411.003" | 10.
| data-sort-value="1720-07-01" | 1720
| Partitas and sonatas for solo violin No. 2: Partita No. 1
| B min.
| Vl
| data-sort-value="000.27 1: 004" | 271: 3
| data-sort-value="VI/01: 010" | VI/1: 10rev 3: 10
| 
| 
|- style="background: #E3F6CE;"
| data-sort-value="1003.000" | 1003
| data-sort-value="411.004" | 10.
| data-sort-value="1720-07-01" | 1720
| Sonatas and partitas for solo violin No. 3: Sonata No. 2
| A min.
| Vl
| data-sort-value="000.27 1: 005" | 271: 3
| data-sort-value="VI/01: 020" | VI/1: 20rev 3: 20
| data-sort-value="→ BWV 0964" | → BWV 964
| 
|- style="background: #E3F6CE;"
| data-sort-value="1004.000" | 1004
| data-sort-value="412.001" | 10.
| data-sort-value="1720-07-01" | 1720
| Partitas and sonatas for solo violin No. 4: Partita No. 2
| D min.
| Vl
| data-sort-value="000.27 1: 006" | 271: 3
| data-sort-value="VI/01: 030" | VI/1: 30rev 3: 30
| 
| 
|- style="background: #E3F6CE;"
| data-sort-value="1005.000" | 1005
| data-sort-value="412.002" | 10.
| data-sort-value="1720-07-01" | 1720
| Sonatas and partitas for solo violin No. 5: Sonata No. 3
| C maj.
| Vl
| data-sort-value="000.27 1: 007" | 271: 3
| data-sort-value="VI/01: 042" | VI/1: 42rev 3: 42
| after "Komm, Heiliger Geist, Herre Gott"; → BWV 968
| 
|- style="background: #E3F6CE;"
| data-sort-value="1006.100" | 1006.1
| data-sort-value="412.003" | 10.
| data-sort-value="1720-07-01" | 1720
| Partitas and sonatas for solo violin No. 6: Partita No. 3
| E maj.
| Vl
| data-sort-value="000.27 1: 008" | 271: 3
| data-sort-value="VI/01: 054" | VI/1: 54rev 3: 54
| → BWV 1006.2, 29/1 and 120a/4
| 
|- id="Cello Suites" style="background: #F5F6CE;"
| data-sort-value="1007.000" | 1007
| data-sort-value="413.002" | 10.
| data-sort-value="1720-06-30" | 1720 (AMB)
| Suite for cello No. 1
| G maj.
| Vc
| data-sort-value="000.27 1: 059" | 271: 59
| data-sort-value="VI/02: 002" | VI/2: 2
| 
| 
|- style="background: #F5F6CE;"
| data-sort-value="1008.000" | 1008
| data-sort-value="413.003" | 10.
| data-sort-value="1720-06-30" | 1720 (AMB)
| Suite for cello No. 2
| D min.
| Vc
| data-sort-value="000.27 1: 060" | 271: 59
| data-sort-value="VI/02: 008" | VI/2: 8
| 
| 
|- style="background: #F5F6CE;"
| data-sort-value="1009.000" | 1009
| data-sort-value="413.004" | 10.
| data-sort-value="1720-06-30" | 1720 (AMB)
| Suite for cello No. 3
| C maj.
| Vc
| data-sort-value="000.27 1: 061" | 271: 59
| data-sort-value="VI/02: 014" | VI/2:14
| 
| 
|- style="background: #F5F6CE;"
| data-sort-value="1010.000" | 1010
| data-sort-value="413.005" | 10.
| data-sort-value="1720-06-30" | 1720 (AMB)
| Suite for cello No. 4
| E♭ maj.
| Vc
| data-sort-value="000.27 1: 062" | 271: 59
| data-sort-value="VI/02: 022" | VI/2: 22
| 
| 
|- style="background: #F5F6CE;"
| data-sort-value="1011.000" | 1011
| data-sort-value="414.002" | 10.
| data-sort-value="1720-06-30" | 1720 (AMB)
| Suite for cello No. 5
| C min.
| Vc
| data-sort-value="000.27 1: 063" | 271: 59
| data-sort-value="VI/02: 032" | VI/2: 32
| data-sort-value="→ BWV 0995" | → BWV 995
| 
|- style="background: #F5F6CE;"
| data-sort-value="1012.000" | 1012
| data-sort-value="414.003" | 10.
| data-sort-value="1720-06-30" | 1720 (AMB)
| Suite for cello No. 6
| D maj.
| Vc
| data-sort-value="000.27 1: 064" | 271: 59
| data-sort-value="VI/02: 040" | VI/2:40
| 
| 
|-
| data-sort-value="1013.000" | 1013
| data-sort-value="414.004" | 10.
| data-sort-value="1720-07-01" | 
| Partita for flute
| A min.
| Fl
| 
| data-sort-value="VI/03: 003" | VI/3: 3
| 
| 
|- style="background: #E3F6CE;"
| data-sort-value="1014.000" | 1014
| data-sort-value="415.003" | 10.
| data-sort-value="1720-07-01" | 
| Sonata for violin and harpsichord No. 1
| B min.
| Vl Hc
| data-sort-value="000.09: 069" | 9: 69
| data-sort-value="VI/01: 083" | VI/1: 83rev 3: 83
| 
| 
|- style="background: #E3F6CE;"
| data-sort-value="1015.000" | 1015
| data-sort-value="415.004" | 10.
| data-sort-value="1720-07-01" | 
| Sonata for violin and harpsichord No. 2
| A maj.
| Vl Hc
| data-sort-value="000.09: 084" | 9: 84
| data-sort-value="VI/01: 099" | VI/1: 99rev 3: 99
| 
| 
|- style="background: #E3F6CE;"
| data-sort-value="1016.000" | 1016
| data-sort-value="416.001" | 10.
| data-sort-value="1720-07-01" | 
| Sonata for violin and harpsichord No. 3
| E maj.
| Vl Hc
| data-sort-value="000.09: 098" | 9: 98
| data-sort-value="VI/01: 115" | VI/1: 115rev 3: 115
| 
| 
|- style="background: #E3F6CE;"
| data-sort-value="1017.000" | 1017
| data-sort-value="416.002" | 10.
| data-sort-value="1720-07-01" | 
| Sonata for violin and harpsichord No. 4
| C min.
| Vl Hc
| data-sort-value="000.09: 120" | 9: 120
| data-sort-value="VI/01: 136" | VI/1: 136rev 3: 136
| 
| 
|- style="background: #E3F6CE;"
| data-sort-value="1018.200" | 1018.2
| data-sort-value="416.003" | 10.
| data-sort-value="1720-07-01" | 
| Sonata for violin and harpsichord No. 5
| F min.
| Vl Hc
| data-sort-value="000.09: 136" | 9: 136
| data-sort-value="VI/01: 153" | VI/1: 153rev 3: 153
| after BWV 1018.1
| 
|- style="background: #E3F6CE;"
| data-sort-value="1018.100" | 1018.1
| data-sort-value="416.004" | 10.
| data-sort-value="1720-07-01" | 
| Adagio, early version of BWV 1018/3
| F min.
| Vl Hc
| data-sort-value="000.09: 250" | 9: 250
| data-sort-value="VI/01: 195" | VI/1: 195rev 3: 194
| → BWV 1018.2/3
| 
|- style="background: #E3F6CE;"
| data-sort-value="1019.300" | 1019.3
| data-sort-value="416.005" | 10.
| data-sort-value="1730-07-01" | after 1729?
| Sonata for violin and harpsichord No. 6
| rowspan="3" | G maj.
| rowspan="3" | Vl Hc
| data-sort-value="000.09: 154" | 9: 154
| data-sort-value="VI/01: 172" | VI/1: 172rev 3: 172
| after BWV 1019.2
| 
|- style="background: #E3F6CE;"
| data-sort-value="1019.100" | 1019.1
| data-sort-value="417.001" rowspan="2" | 10.
| data-sort-value="1725-07-01" | 
| Sonata for violin and harpsichord No. 6, early version 1 (partially lost)
| data-sort-value="000.09: 252" rowspan="2" | 9: 252
| data-sort-value="VI/01: 197" | VI/1: 197rev 3: 196
| data-sort-value="after BWV 0120a/4," | → BWV 830/3, /6, 1019.2 
| 
|- style="background: #E3F6CE;"
| data-sort-value="1019.200" | 1019.2
| data-sort-value="1730-12-31" | 
| Sonata for violin and harpsichord No. 6, early version 2
| data-sort-value="VI/01: 197" | VI/1: 197rev 3: 218
| data-sort-value="after BWV 0120a/4," | after BWV 1019.1, 120.1/4; → BWV 1019.3 
| 
|- style="background: #E3F6CE;"
| data-sort-value="1021.000" | 1021
| data-sort-value="417.003" | 10.
| data-sort-value="1732-12-31" | 1732–1733
| Sonata for violin and continuo
| G maj.
| Vl Bc
| 
| data-sort-value="VI/01: 065" | VI/1: 65rev 3: 65
| → BWV 1022, 1038
| 
|-
| data-sort-value="1023.000" | 1023
| data-sort-value="418.002" | 10.
| data-sort-value="1715-12-31" | 1714–1717?
| Sonata for violin and continuo
| E min.
| Vl Bc
| data-sort-value="000.43 1: 031" | 431: 31
| data-sort-value="VI/01: 073" | VI/1: 73rev 3: 73
| 
| 
|- style="background: #F5F6CE;"
| data-sort-value="1025.100" | 1025.1
| data-sort-value="418.004" | 10.
| data-sort-value="1742-12-31" | after 1739?
| Suite for violin and keyboard
| A maj.
| Vl Kb
| data-sort-value="000.09: 043" | 9: 43
| data-sort-value="VI/05: 067" | VI/5: 67
| after Weiss; → BWV 1025.2
| 
|- style="background: #E3F6CE;"
| data-sort-value="1025.200" | 1025.2
| data-sort-value="418.004" | 10.
| data-sort-value="1746-12-31" | ?
| Suite for violin and keyboard (incomplete)
| A maj.
| Vl Kb
| data-sort-value="000.09: 043" | 9: 43
| data-sort-value="VI/05: 097" | VI/5: 97
| after BWV 1025.1
| 
|-
| data-sort-value="1026.000" | 1026
| data-sort-value="419.002" | 10.
| data-sort-value="1715-12-31" | 1714–1717
| Fugue for violin and continuo
| G min.
| Vl Bc
| data-sort-value="000.43 1: 039" | 431: 39
| data-sort-value="VI/05: 059" | VI/5: 59
| 
| 
|- style="background: #E3F6CE;"
| data-sort-value="1027.000" | 1027
| data-sort-value="419.004" | 10.
| data-sort-value="1742-07-01" | 1742
| Sonata for gamba and harpsichord No. 1
| G maj.
| Gam Hc
| data-sort-value="000.09: 175" | 9: 175
| data-sort-value="VI/04: 031" | VI/4: 3
| after BWV 1039; → 1027/1a /2a /4a
| 
|-
| data-sort-value="1028.000" | 1028
| data-sort-value="420.002" | 10.
| 
| Sonata for gamba and harpsichord No. 2
| D maj.
| Gam Hc
| data-sort-value="000.09: 176" | 9: 175
| data-sort-value="VI/04: 021" | VI/4: 21
| 
| 
|- style="background: #E3F6CE;"
| data-sort-value="1029.000" | 1029
| data-sort-value="420.003" | 10.
| 
| Sonata for gamba and harpsichord No. 3
| G min.
| Gam Hc
| data-sort-value="000.09: 177" | 9: 175
| data-sort-value="VI/04: 036" | VI/4: 36
| data-sort-value="→ BWV 0545b" | → BWV 545b
| 
|- style="background: #E3F6CE;"
| data-sort-value="1030.200" | 1030.2
| data-sort-value="420.004" | 10.
| data-sort-value="1736-12-31" | 1736–1737
| Sonata for flute and harpsichord
| B min.
| Fl Hc
| data-sort-value="000.09: 003" | 9: 3 
| data-sort-value="VI/03: 033" | VI/3: 33
| after BWV 1030.1
| 
|-
| data-sort-value="1030.100" | 1030.1
| data-sort-value="420.005" | 10.
| data-sort-value="1726-12-31" | 1717–1736
| Sonata for unknown instrument and harpsichord
| G min.
| v Hc
|  
| data-sort-value="VI/03: 089" | VI/3: 89
| → BWV 1030.2
| 
|- style="background: #E3F6CE;"
| data-sort-value="1032.000" | 1032
| data-sort-value="421.003" | 10.
| data-sort-value="1736-12-31" | 1736–1737
| Sonata for flute and harpsichord (/1 incomplete)
| A maj.
| Fl Hc
| data-sort-value="000.09: 032" | 9: 32, 245 
| data-sort-value="VI/03: 054" | VI/3: 54
| data-sort-value="→ BWV 0525a" | → BWV 525a
| 
|-
| data-sort-value="1034.000" | 1034
| data-sort-value="421.005" | 10.
| data-sort-value="1720-07-01" | 1717–1723?
| Sonata for flute and continuo
| E min.
| Fl Bc
| data-sort-value="000.43 1: 009" | 431: 9 
| data-sort-value="VI/03: 011" | VI/3: 11
| 
| 
|-
| data-sort-value="1035.000" | 1035
| data-sort-value="421.006" | 10.
| data-sort-value="1720-07-01" | 1717–1723?
| Sonata for flute and continuo
| E maj.
| Fl Bc
| data-sort-value="000.43 1: 021" | 431: 21
| data-sort-value="VI/03: 023" | VI/3: 23
| 
| 
|-
| data-sort-value="1039.000" | 1039
| data-sort-value="423.001" | 10.
| data-sort-value="1716-07-01" | 1708–1726
| Sonata
| G maj.
| data-sort-value="Flx2 Bc" | 2Fl Bc
| data-sort-value="000.09: 260" | 9: 260 
| data-sort-value="VI/03: 071" | VI/3: 71
| → BWV 1027
| 
|}

References

 
Bach, Johann Sebastian
Chamber music works by Johann Sebastian Bach, List of